James Donald "Jim" Weinrich (born 1950) is an American sex researcher and psychobiologist. Much of his work examines the relationship of biology and sexual orientation. He won the Outstanding Contributions to Sexual Science Award at the 2011 Society for the Scientific Study of Sexuality (SSSS) Western Region annual meeting. He has also won the SSSS Hugo Beigel Award for the best paper published in The Journal of Sex Research (co-authored with Richard Pillard). Weinrich served as the editor-in-chief of the Journal of Bisexuality from 2011 to 2014. He has also served on the editorial boards for The Journal of Sex Research and the Journal of Homosexuality.

Life and career

Weinrich earned a bachelor's degree in mathematics from Princeton University in 1972. He graduated with a Ph.D. in biology from Harvard University in 1976. He was Robert Trivers' first graduate student, and his 1976 dissertation addressed social-class differences in heterosexual behaviors, and the evolutionary adaptiveness of same-sex attraction.

For the next three years, he was a Harvard Junior Fellow. He then moved to Baltimore for a post-doctoral fellowship at Johns Hopkins University with sexologist John Money. In 1983, he went to Boston to work with Richard Pillard at Boston University School of Medicine. While working with Pillard, he devised "The Periodic Table of the Gender Transposition." In 1987, he moved to the University of California, San Diego to work with Igor Grant researching effects of AIDS on the brain. He served as Assistant Adjunct Professor of Psychiatry and in 1990 was appointed the original Center Manager and Data Manager for the HIV Neurobehavioral Research Center (HNRC). He later became Principal Investigator of the HNRC Sexology Project, serving until 2000. After working for several years as an independent Internet consultant and entrepreneur, Weinrich returned to teaching in 2006, and he returned to school to earn a master's degree in psychology from San Diego State University. Since moving to San Diego, he has taught at San Diego State University, Grossmont College, Miramar College, Southwestern College, San Diego City College, National University and California State University San Marcos.

Among Weinrich's contributions are the "Limerent and Lusty Sex Theory" developed with Richard Pillard, which holds that there are two kinds of sex drives, and that both exist in men and women. He and Pillard also found that homosexuality runs in some families.

Selected bibliography
Pillard RC, Weinrich JD (1987). The periodic table model of the gender transpositions: Part I. A theory based on masculinization and defeminization of the brain. Journal of Sex Research. 23(4):425-454.
Weinrich JD (1988) The periodic table model of the gender transpositions: Part II. Limerent and lusty sexual attractions and the nature of bisexuality. Journal of Sex Research. 24(1), 113–129.
Weinrich JD (1997). Strange bedfellows: Homosexuality, gay liberation, and the Internet. Journal of Sex Education & Therapy. Vol 22(1), Jun 1997, 58–66.
Kaplan RM, Anderson JP, Patterson TL, McCutchan JA, Weinrich JD, Heaton RK, Atkinson JH, Thal L, Chandler J, Grant I: HIV Neurobehavioral Research Center (1995). Validity of the Quality of Well-Being Scale for persons with human immunodeficiency virus infection. Psychosomatic Medicine, March 1, 1995, vol. 57 no. 2 138–147. 
Weinrich JD, Atkinson JH Jr, McCutchan JA, Grant I: HIV Neurobehavioral Research Center (1995). Is gender dysphoria dysphoric? Elevated depression and anxiety in gender dysphoric and nondysphoric homosexual and bisexual men in an HIV sample. Arch Sex Behav. 1995 Feb;24(1):55-72. 
Gonsiorek JC, Sell RL, Weinrich JD (1995). Definition and measurement of sexual orientation. Suicide Life Threat Behav. 1995;25 Suppl:40-51. 
Weinrich JD (1995). Biological research on sexual orientation: a critique of the critics. J Homosex. 1995;28(1-2):197-213. 
Snyder PJ, Weinrich JD, Pillard RC (1994). Personality and lipid level differences associated with homosexual and bisexual identity in men. Arch Sex Behav. 1994 Aug;23(4):433-51. 
Pillard RC, Rosen LR, Meyer-Bahlburg H, Weinrich JD, Feldman JF, Gruen R, Ehrhardt AA (1993). Psychopathology and social functioning in men prenatally exposed to diethylstilbestrol (DES). Psychosom Med. 1993 Nov-Dec;55(6):485-91. 
Weinrich JD, Snyder PJ, Pillard RC, Grant I, Jacobson DL, Robinson SR, McCutchan JA (1993). A factor analysis of the Klein sexual orientation grid in two disparate samples. Arch Sex Behav. 1993 Apr;22(2):157-68. 
Grant I, Olshen RA, Atkinson JH, Heaton RK, Nelson J, McCutchan JA, Weinrich JD (1993). Depressed mood does not explain neuropsychological deficits in HIV-infected persons. Neuropsychology, Vol 7(1), Jan 1993, 53–61. 
Weinrich JD, Grant I, Jacobson DL, Robinson SR, McCutchan JA: HIV Neurobehavioral Research Center (1992). Effects of recalled childhood gender nonconformity on adult genitoerotic role and AIDS exposure. Arch Sex Behav. 1992 Dec;21(6):559-85. 
Day JJ, Grant I, Atkinson JH, Brysk LT, McCutchan JA, Hesselink JR, Heaton RK, Weinrich JD, Spector SA, Richman DD (1992).  Incidence of AIDS dementia in a two-year follow-up of AIDS and ARC patients on an initial phase II AZT placebo-controlled study: San Diego cohort. J Neuropsychiatry Clin Neurosci. 1992 Winter;4(1):15-20. 
Gonsiorek JC, Weinrich JD (1991). Homosexuality: research implications for public policy. Sage Publications, 
Weinrich JD (1988). Sex survey. Science. 1988 Oct 7;242(4875):16. 
Weinrich JD (1987). Sexual landscapes: why we are what we are, why we love whom we love. Scribner's, 
Pillard RC, Weinrich JD. Evidence of familial nature of male homosexuality. Arch Gen Psychiatry. 1986 Aug;43(8):808-12. 
Money J, Weinrich JD (1983). Juvenile, pedophile, heterophile: hermeneutics of science, medicine and law in two outcome studies. Med Law. 1983;2(1):39-54. 
Weinrich JD (1980). Toward a sociobiological theory of the emotions. In Plutchik R, Kellerman H (eds.) Emotion: Theory, research, and experience. Academic Press, 
Weinrich JD (1978). Nonreproduction, homosexuality, transsexualism, and intelligence: I. A systematic literature search. J Homosex. 1978 Spring;3(3):275-89. 
Weinrich JD (1977). Human sociobiology: Pair-bonding and resource predictability (effects of social class and race). Behavioral Ecology and Sociobiology Vol. 2, No. 2, 1977, pp. 91–118.
Weinrich JD (1975).  Human family size and marital relations: a biological interpretation. Harvard, Bowdoin Prize for Essays in the Natural Sciences

References

External links
, University of California, San Diego
James D. Weinrich faculty page via Grossmont College

1950 births
American sexologists
Living people
Princeton University alumni
Harvard Graduate School of Arts and Sciences alumni